Rainieria antennaepes is a species of stilt-legged flies in the family Micropezidae found in North America east of the Rocky Mountains. The name "antennaepes" means "antenna foot". They frequently hold their white-tipped front legs up and wave them around in a manner that makes them appear like the antennae of ichneumonid wasps. They feed on detritus, bird droppings, and similar waste.

Rainieria antennaepes is the only member of its genus found in North America.

References

External links

 

Micropezidae
Diptera of North America
Insects described in 1823
Taxa named by Thomas Say
Articles created by Qbugbot